Anatoma tenuisculpta is a species of minute sea snail, a marine gastropod mollusk or micromollusk in the family Anatomidae.

References

 Geiger D.L. (2012) Monograph of the little slit shells. Volume 1. Introduction, Scissurellidae. pp. 1-728. Volume 2. Anatomidae, Larocheidae, Depressizonidae, Sutilizonidae, Temnocinclidae. pp. 729–1291. Santa Barbara Museum of Natural History Monographs Number 7

External links
 To World Register of Marine Species

Anatomidae
Gastropods described in 1877